"Eeny Meeny Miny Moe" is the seventh single by the Dutch girl group Luv', released in the summer of 1979 by Philips/Phonogram Records. This song appears on the formation's second album Lots Of Luv' and entered the record charts in Benelux, German-speaking countries and Denmark.

Background
After the success of Casanova on the Continental European charts, "Eeny Meeny Miny Moe" was released as the follow-up single. The track's title and chorus lyrics deal with a famous children's counting rhyme in English-speaking countries (Eeny Meeny Miny Moe). Its Bouzouki and Balalejka-theme is highly inspired by Boney M.'s "Rasputin".
Prior to the release of the single, Luv' and their producer Hans van Hemert were not satisfied by the way Philips/Phonogram Records promoted their records. They were about to leave the label and were looking for another deal. The Dutch press speculated for weeks about their future record company. In October 1979, the trio signed a contract with CNR/Carrere.

Commercial performance
"Eeny Meeny Miny Moe" was a Top 10 hit in Flanders (Belgium) and Denmark, a Top 20 hit in the Netherlands and Switzerland as well as a Top 40 hit in Germany.

Track listing and release

7" Vinyl 

 a. "Eeny Meeny Miny Moe"
 b. "I.M.U.R"

7" Vinyl France

Philips/Phonogram French subsidiary released I.M.U.R as a A-side and Eeny Meeny Miny Moe as a B-side.

 a. "I.M.U.R"
 b. "Eeny Meeny Miny Moe"

Cover version
 Pop/Disco artist, Mona Carita, covered the track in Finnish entitled "Kuti Kuti Kultasein " which was included on her 1979 eponymous album.

Charts

Weekly charts

Year-end charts

References

1979 singles
Luv' songs
Songs written by Piet Souer
Songs written by Hans van Hemert
Phonogram Records singles
Philips Records singles
1979 songs
Songs based on children's songs